Rosina McManus (Róisín Mhic Mhánais) from Antrim was the 14th president of the Camogie Association.

Presidency
She organised coaching courses in Belfast which were filmed for promotional purposes. During her presidency in 1969, the All-Ireland Colleges Council was set up with Lily Spence as chair, and the first All Ireland Colleges Camogie Championship was completed.

She continued to referee matches after her presidency and refereed the 1980 All Ireland final and replay.

Death at Camogie match
On 16 June 2008 she collapsed shortly after the final whistle sounded for the Ulster Senior final between Derry and Antrim in Dunloy. She was taken to Causeway Hospital, but died 48 hours later. She had been training the Connolly Under 14s right up to the week before her death.

References

Presidents of the Camogie Association
Gaelic games players from County Antrim
2008 deaths
Year of birth missing